Discogobio tetrabarbatus is a fish species in the genus Discogobio endemic to sections of the Pearl River in China.

References

External links 

Cyprinid fish of Asia
Fish described in 1931
Discogobio